The Senior Players Championship, stylised by the PGA Tour as The SENIOR PLAYERS Championship, is one of the five major championships on golf's PGA Tour Champions.  The inaugural event was played  in 1983 and the age minimum is 50, the standard for men's senior professional golf tournaments. The winner gains entry into the following season's Players Championship on the PGA Tour. For sponsorship reasons, from 2023, the tournament will be titled as the Kaulig Companies Championship.

Unlike the U.S. Senior Open, the Senior PGA Championship, and the Senior Open Championship, it is not recognized as a major by the European Senior Tour, and is not part of that tour's schedule.

Since 2019, the Senior Players championship has been held at Firestone Country Club in Akron, Ohio; it replaced the WGC-Bridgestone Invitational that had been held there before moving to Memphis, Tennessee.

Winners

Multiple winners
The following men had more than one win in the Senior Players Championship through 2022:
3 wins: Bernhard Langer (2014, 2015, 2016)
2 wins: Arnold Palmer (1984, 1985), Dave Stockton (1992, 1994), Raymond Floyd (1996, 2000), Jerry Kelly (2020, 2022)

Winners of both The Players and the Senior Players
The following men have won both The Players Championship and the Senior Players Championship:

Notes

References

External links
Coverage on the PGA Tour Champions' official site

1983 establishments in Ohio
Belmont, Massachusetts
Golf in Florida
Golf in Maryland
Golf in Massachusetts
Golf in Michigan
Golf in New York (state)
Golf in Ohio
Golf in Pennsylvania
History of Middlesex County, Massachusetts
PGA Tour Champions events
Sports competitions in Florida
Sports competitions in Maryland
Sports competitions in Massachusetts
Sports competitions in Michigan
Sports competitions in New York (state)
Sports competitions in Ohio
Sports competitions in Pennsylvania
Sports in Middlesex County, Massachusetts
Recurring sporting events established in 1983
Tourist attractions in Middlesex County, Massachusetts